The Len Cantello Testimonial Match, (West Bromwich Albion XI v Cyrille Regis & Laurie Cunningham XI),  was a testimonial football match that took place in May 1979 to celebrate West Bromwich Albion player Len Cantello, who played for the club over 300 times between 1968 and 1979. The teams were selected based on the colour of the players' skin. The West Bromwich Albion XI was composed of white players while the Cyrille Regis & Laurie Cunningham XI was composed of black players.

The West Brom XI team featured Tony Godden, Paddy Mulligan, Derek Statham, Tony Brown, John Wile, Bryan Robson, Johnny Giles, John Trewick, Alistair Brown, Len Cantello, David Mills, David Stewart, Martyn Bennett and Kevin Summerfield.

The Cyrille Regis & Laurie Cunningham XI featured Ian Benjamin (Sheffield United), Vernon Hodgson (West Bromwich Albion – a trialist), Brendon Batson (West Bromwich Albion), Derek Richardson (QPR), Stewart Phillips (Hereford United), George Berry (Wolverhampton Wanderers), Bob Hazell (Wolverhampton Wanderers), Garth Crooks (Stoke City), Winston White (Hereford Utd), Cyrille Regis (West Bromwich Albion), Laurie Cunningham (West Bromwich Albion), Remi Moses (West Bromwich Albion), Valmore Thomas (Hereford United). Benjamin, Phillips, Crooks and White would go on to sign for West Bromwich Albion later during their playing career. Roger Palmer was expected to play but was not available.

Match details
Line up according to the match programme.

Documentary

The match was the basis of a BBC documentary entitled Whites Vs Blacks: How Football Changed A Nation. The documentary was aired on BBC Two on 27 November 2016.

References

1978–79 in English football
Black British history
West Bromwich Albion F.C. matches
May 1979 sports events in the United Kingdom